Legislative elections were held in France September 1791 to elect the Legislative Assembly, the first national election for the legislature. Suffrage was limited to men paying taxes were allowed to vote, although less than 25% of those eligible to do so voted.

Background
In July 1791 the National Constituent Assembly created a constitution committee of 30 members, which drew up a constitution adopted on 3 September. This provided for a 745-seat Legislative Assembly with members elected for a two-year term. The constitutionl also turned France into a constitutional monarchy.

Results
Around 4.3 million men voted in the election. There were no formal political parties, although informal groups such as the Feuillants, Jacobins and the Réunion club emerged. Of the 767 members during the Assembly's term, 278 only ever case 'no' votes to motions, while 242 only ever votes 'yes'.

Aftermath
The newly-elected Assembly convened for the first time on 1 October.

References

Legislative elections in France
Legislative
18th-century elections in Europe
1791 events of the French Revolution